David Wilkinson may refer to:

David Wilkinson (machinist) (1771–1852), American inventor
David Wilkinson (scientist), Canadian scientist
David Wilkinson (political scientist) (born 1939), American political scientist
David Wilkinson (theologian) (born 1963), British theologian
David Wilkinson (judoka) (born 1973), Australian judoka
David Todd Wilkinson (1935–2002), American cosmologist
David L. Wilkinson, Attorney General of Utah, 1981–1989
David Wilkinson, Chairman of Luton Town F.C. since 2018